Colette Bailly (born 27 August 1928) is a French pianist and composer, a student of Max Deutsch in Paris.

Selected works 
 Chamber symphony (1968) 	
 Ko-hi-nhor for orchestra (1974) 	
 Trio de chambre for piano, violin and cello (1968), premiered by the Altenberg Trio

References 

French women composers
Living people
1928 births